Seo Taiji Company is a South Korean entertainment company headquartered in Seoul, South Korea. The company was founded in 2001 by South Korean musician  Seo Taiji. The company  evolved into a major producer of Korean popular music, and also functions as a management agency for several Korean pop stars.

History
The company was founded on March 24, 2001. In December 2001, Seo Taiji Company revealed the "Seotaiji font" for its Christmas events. From January 22 to 30, the company hosted the first public hiring of its employees. In 2002, the company signed a joint business affiliation agreement regarding the collaboration on company affairs and promotion of Taiji's 7th and 8th album. In October 7 of 2002, company affiliated with the Korean portal site Daum. In 2002 its sub label Goesoo Indigene was founded which aimed to find underground talents. Nell was the first to debut in the sublabel.

Artists
Diablo
Nell
Pia

References

External links

Talent agencies of South Korea
South Korean record labels
Rock record labels
Record labels established in 2001